Paul Lawrence Smith (June 24, 1936 – April 25, 2012) was an American-Israeli actor and director. Burly, bearded and imposing, he appeared in feature films and occasionally on television since the 1960s, generally playing "heavies" and bad guys. His most notable roles include Hamidou, the vicious prison guard in Midnight Express (1978), Bluto in Robert Altman's Popeye (1980), Gideon in the ABC miniseries Masada (1981), Glossu "Beast" Rabban in David Lynch's Dune (1984) and Falkon in Red Sonja (1985). He was most frequently credited as Paul Smith or Paul L. Smith, but was also billed as P. L. Smith and Paul Lawrence Smith.

Career
Smith's first acting role, at age 24, was in Otto Preminger's 1960 epic Exodus, which was filmed in Israel. This was his first visit to the country. In 1967, Smith returned to Israel as a Mahal volunteer in the Six-Day War and remained for six years, appearing in locally filmed features and television productions. He received director credit on the 1970 documentary Milhemet 20 HaShanim (War of 20 Years) and the 1972 crime drama Jacko Vehayatzaniot (Jacko and the Prostitute or Tel Aviv Call Girls).

Between 1973 and 1977, Smith made a series of films with  Michael Coby (pseudonym of Antonio Cantafora), a Terence Hill lookalike in Bud & Terence-fashion.  One of these films Convoy Buddies was selected for American release by Film Ventures International, and producer Edward L. Montoro changed Smith's name to "Bob Spencer" and Cantafora's name to "Terrance Hall". Smith sued, successfully arguing that an actor's name recognition is vital to his career. The judicial system agreed and ruled against FVI, which paid Smith damages and court costs.

Smith made appearances in such films as 21 Hours at Munich (1976), Midnight Express (1978), as Bluto in Popeye (1980), and as Glossu Rabban in Dune (1984). On television he appeared in such established series as Emergency!, CHiPS, Wonder Woman, Barney Miller and Hawaii Five-O.

Death
On April 25, 2012, Smith died in Ra'anana two months before his 76th birthday.

Filmography

Discography
 I'm Mean (1980)

References

External links
 
 

1936 births
2012 deaths
20th-century American male actors
21st-century American male actors
American emigrants to Israel
American male film actors
American male television actors
Jewish American male actors
Male actors from Massachusetts
People from Everett, Massachusetts
21st-century American Jews